Fazlur Rahman Khan (1939–1971) was a Bangladeshi intellectual and geologist, who was killed in the Bangladesh Liberation war and is considered a martyr in Bangladesh.

Early life
Khan was born in Kajiati in Mohanganj Upazila, Netrokona on 2 March 1939. He graduated from Mohanganj High School in 1954 and Ananda Mohan College in 1956. He completed his BSc with honors in soil science from Dhaka University in 1960 and MSc in 1962.

Career
Khan joined Dhaka University in 1963 as a lecturer in soil science. In 1964 he went to England to pursue his PhD from the University of London. His research topic was Nutrient Metabolism in Soil at High Moisture Level. He returned to Dhaka University after completion of his PhD in 1968 and was promoted to senior lecturer.

Death
On 25 March 1971, at the start of Operation Searchlight, Pakistan Army attacked his home in Nilkhet residential area. He was shot and killed as was his nephew Kanchan in the early morning of 26 March 1971. Both were buried in Azimpur graveyard.

References

1939 births
1971 deaths
People killed in the Bangladesh Liberation War
People from Netrokona District
University of Dhaka alumni
Alumni of the University of London
Academic staff of the University of Dhaka